Calvin Clifford Chaffee (August 28, 1811 – August 8, 1896) was an American doctor and politician. He was an outspoken opponent of slavery.

Life and work
Born in Saratoga Springs, New York, Chaffee graduated from the medical school of Middlebury College, Middlebury, Vermont, in 1835. He settled in Springfield, Massachusetts, where he began his medical practice.

In 1854 he was elected on the American Party ticket to the Thirty-fourth Congress as part of the Know Nothing party sweep of the Massachusetts congressional delegation that year. An abolitionist who received an honorary degree from Amherst in the same ceremony as Charles Sumner, he became a Republican and was reelected to Congress as such in 1856.

He was married to Clara Nourse (1813 – 1848) until her death in 1848. They had two children: a daughter, Emma Lovetta Wilder (Chaffee) (1838 – 1910) and a son, Clemens Clifford Chaffee (1841 – 1867).

In 1850 Chaffee married Eliza Irene Emerson (née Sanford) (1815 – 1903). Irene Emerson was the widow of Dr. John Emerson, the owner of the slave Dred Scott. She had a daughter, Henrietta Sanford King (Emerson) (1843 – 1919), from her first marriage. There is speculation  that Chaffee advanced the Dred Scott case as a test for slavery.  However, contemporary reports have him discover from the Springfield Argus that his new wife owned the most famous slave in the world in February 1857, only a month before the Supreme Court handed down the infamous Dred Scott decision. Criticized nationwide for apparent hypocrisy, Chaffee immediately arranged for the return of Scott to his original owners, the Blow family, for emancipation.

Because of negative publicity from the Scott case, Chaffee did not seek reelection in 1858 and became Librarian of the House of Representatives from 1860-1862. He then practiced medicine in Washington, D.C. until 1876, when he returned to Springfield. He died there in 1896 at age 84.

References

Bibliography

External links

 Biography of Dred Scott by Christyn Elley, Missouri State Archives

1811 births
1896 deaths
Politicians from Saratoga Springs, New York
American abolitionists
Middlebury College alumni
Politicians from Springfield, Massachusetts
Know-Nothing members of the United States House of Representatives from Massachusetts
Republican Party members of the United States House of Representatives from Massachusetts
19th-century American politicians